Jane Storm (born Genevieve Grogan; November 4, 1894 – May 15, 1982) was an American screenwriter active in the 1930s and 1940s.

Biography 
Genevieve Grogan was born in Cyget, Ohio, in 1894 to Michael Grogan and Mary King. She was raised in Ohio as part of a big family, and they were all living in Los Angeles by 1920.

In 1926, she married her first husband, commercial artist Floyd Storm. The marriage did not last long; by 1931, she had sought (and won) a divorce on the grounds that Floyd was drinking heavily.

She got her start in the film industry working as a stenographer and then in the scenario department at Paramount. In 1933, she was promoted to full-fledged writer; her first writing assignment was working on Green Loaning with Phil Strong. Over the next decade or so, she'd write or contribute to more than a dozen scripts.

She was married to Homer Berry—a pioneering aviator—in 1942; the pair had no children.

Selected filmography 

 Mrs. Wiggs of the Cabbage Patch (1942)
 Sandy Gets Her Man (1940)
 Love on Toast (1947)
 Millions in the Air (1935)
 Two for Tonight (1935)
 Mrs. Wiggs of the Cabbage Patch (1934)
 Such Women Are Dangerous (1934)
 My Lips Betray (1933)
 Adorable (1933)

References 

American women screenwriters
Writers from Ohio
20th-century American women writers
1894 births
1982 deaths
20th-century American screenwriters